A partial solar eclipse occurred on August 12, 1942. A solar eclipse occurs when the Moon passes between Earth and the Sun, thereby totally or partly obscuring the image of the Sun for a viewer on Earth. A partial solar eclipse occurs in the polar regions of the Earth when the center of the Moon's shadow misses the Earth. This was the 72nd of 72 solar eclipses in Saros 115 and the final eclipse.

Related eclipses

Solar eclipses 1942–1946

Metonic series

See also
 Moon's orbit

References

External links 

1942 8 12
1942 in science
1942 8 12
August 1942 events